The Regiment "Cavalleggeri Guide" (19th) ( - "Guide Chevau-légers") is a cavalry unit of the Italian Army based in Salerno in Campania. The regiment was the only Guide cavalry unit of the Savoyard state and later the Kingdom of Italy. Today the regiment is the reconnaissance unit of the Bersaglieri Brigade "Garibaldi".

History

Formation 
On 10 April 1859 the Cavalry School of the Royal Sardinian Army in Pinerolo formed the Horse Guides Squadron. The squadron consisted of seven officers and 150 enlisted men, which were divided into six platoons. The personnel for the squadron was drawn from existing cavalry regiments and mounted on fresh horses. Each of the squadron's platoons was attached to one of the six divisions of the Royal Sardinian Army for the upcoming Second Italian War of Independence, which began on 26 April 1859.

On 25 February 1860 the Horse Guides Squadron entered the newly formed Guides Regiment, which was also integrated the Guides Squadron of the Emilian Army, Lombardian troops, who had previously served in the Austrian Cavalry, and 200 officers and enlisted drawn from existing light cavalry regiments of the Royal Sardinian Army.

In fall of 1860 the regiment participated in the Sardinian campaign in central and southern Italy. In 1864-66 the regiment operated in Campania Capitanata, and Sicily to suppress the anti-Sardinian revolt in Southern Italy after the Kingdom of Sardinia had invaded and annexed the Kingdom of Two Sicilies.

In 1866 the regiment participated in the Third Italian War of Independence and distinguished itself in the Battle of Custoza, for which the regiment was awarded a Silver Medal of Military Valour. Over the next years the regiment repeatedly changed its name:

 10 September 1871: 19th Regiment of Cavalry (Guide)
 5 November 1876: Cavalry Regiment "Guide" (19th)
 16 December 1897: Regiment "Cavalleggeri Guide" (19th)

In 1887 the regiment contributed to the formation of the 1st Cavalry Squadron Africa and the Mounted Hunters Squadron, which fought in the Italo-Ethiopian War of 1887–1889. In 1895-96 the regiment provided 73 enlisted personnel for units deployed to Italian Eritrea for the First Italo-Ethiopian War. In 1911-12 the regiment was deployed to Libya, where it fought in the Italo-Turkish War. Between the Second Italian War of Independence and World War I the Guide ceded on three occasions one of its squadrons to help form new Chevau-légers regiments:

 1 October 1883: Regiment "Cavalleggeri di Catania" (22nd)
 1 November 1887: Regiment "Cavalleggeri di Vicenza" (24th)
 1 October 1909: Regiment "Cavalleggeri di Aquila" (27th)

World War I 
At the outbreak of World War I the regiment consisted of a command, the regimental depot, and two cavalry groups, with the I Group consisting of three squadrons and the II Group consisting of two squadrons and a machine gun section. Together with the Regiment "Cavalleggeri di Treviso" (28th) the Guide formed the VIII Cavalry Brigade of the 4th Cavalry Division of "Piemonte". The regiment fought dismounted on the Italian front: in 1915 on the Karst Plateau and then in 1916 in Monfalcone. In 1916 the regiment was reinforced with the 3rd Squadron of the Regiment "Cavalleggeri di Lodi" (15th). In 1917 the regimental depot in Voghera formed the 737th Dismounted Machine Gunners Company as reinforcement for infantry units on the front.

After the Italian defeat in the Battle of Caporetto in late October 1917, the regiment fought a rearguard actions at the Isonzo river bridge at Lucinico, at the Tagliamento river bridge at Casarsa della Delizia, and at San Vito al Tagliamento. These actions allowed the 3rd Army to escape and reach the new Italian frontline at the Piave river.

After the Italian victory in the Battle of Vittorio Veneto, the regiment advanced through the breach in the Austrian lines liberating Sacile and Cordenons, before stopping in Pozzuolo del Friuli as the Armistice of Villa Giusti came into effect. For the regiment's conduct at Monfalcone and for the liberation of Sacile the regiment was awarded a Bronze Medal of Military Valour.

Interwar years 
After the war the Italian Army disbanded 14 of its 30 cavalry regiments and so on 21 November 1919 the regiment was disbanded and part of its personnel and horses transferred to the Regiment "Cavalleggeri di Foggia" (11th), which formed the II Group "Cavalleggeri Guide" with the new arrivals.

On 20 May 1920 the regiment was reformed in the city Padua, where the regiment took over the barracks of the Regiment "Lancieri di Milano" (7th), which had been disbanded on the same date. The Guide received the II Group "Cavalleggeri Guide" from the disbanded Regiment "Cavalleggeri di Foggia" (11th) and two squadrons from the disbanded Regiment "Cavalleggeri di Lucca" (16th). On the same date the Guide also received the traditions of the disbanded regiments "Lancieri di Milano", "Cavalleggeri di Lucca", "Cavalleggeri di Roma", "Cavalleggeri di Padova", and "Cavalleggeri di Vicenza".

In 1932 the regiment moved from Padua to Parma. The regiment became the first cavalry unit to receive L3/33 tankettes. In 1934 the regiment's cavalry squadrons groups were equipped with tankettes and the regiment became the Fast Tanks School Regiment:

 Regiment "Cavalleggeri Guide" - Fast Tanks School Regiment
 I Fast Tanks Group "San Marco" (1st, 2nd, and 3rd Squadron, formed 5 January 1934)
 II Fast Tanks Group "San Giusto" (4th, 5th, and 6th Squadron, formed 5 April 1934)
 III Fast Tanks Group "San Martino" (7th, 8th, and 9th Squadron, formed 26 June 1934)
 IV Fast Tanks Group "Duca degli Abruzzi" (10th, 11th, and 12th Squadron, formed winter 1934–35)
 V Fast Tanks Group "Baldissera" (13th, 14th, and 15th Squadron, formed spring 1935)
 Mounted Squadrons Group "San Giorgio" (1st and 2nd Squadron, formed 5 January 1934)

In January 1935 the I, II, and III fast tanks groups were transferred to the army's three cavalry divisions (1st Cavalry Division "Eugenio di Savoia", 2nd Cavalry Division "Emanuele Filiberto Testa di Ferro", 3rd Cavalry Division "Principe Amedeo Duca d'Aosta"), while the IV and V fast tanks groups moved to Italian Eritrea in May respectively in August 1935 in preparation for the Second Italo-Ethiopian War.

After ceding the fast tanks groups the Guide became a mounted regiment again, but it also retained its function as fast tanks school. In July 1935 the regiment formed six fast tank squadrons - one for each of the six cavalry regiments, which were not assigned to one of the cavalry divisions. In 1935-36 the "Duca degli Abruzzi" and "Baldissera" groups fought in the Second Italo-Ethiopian War, while the Guide contributed 39 officers and 603 enlisted as reinforcements for units deployed for the war. After the war the "Duca degli Abruzzi" was disbanded in Eritrea in March 1936, while the "Baldissera" was repatriated in February 1936 and then disbanded in Italy.

World War II 
At the outbreak of World War II the regiment consisted of a command, a command squadron, the I and II squadrons groups, each with two mounted squadrons, and the 5th Machine Gunners Squadron. In August 1940 the regiment was sent to Albania, where the Guide, together with the Regiment "Lancieri di Aosta" (6th), Regiment "Lancieri di Milano" (7th), and 3rd Regiment "Granatieri di Sardegna e d'Albania", formed the Littoral Grouping on the extreme right during the initial stages of the Italian invasion of Greece. For its conduct during the initial Italian offensive and the following Greek counter-offensive the regiment was awarded its second Bronze Medal of Military Valour. The regiment participated in the Invasion of Yugoslavia and then remained in Albania, where it was dissolved after the announcement of the Armistice of Cassibile on 8 September 1943.

On 30 November 1940 the regiment's depot in Parma formed the XIV Dismounted Group "Cavalleggeri Guide", which was assigned to the 210th Coastal Division in Salento. After the Armistice of Cassibile the unit was reorganized as 14th Combat Supply Unit "Guide" by the Italian Co-belligerent Army and served in the Italian liberation campaign.

Cold War 

On 1 April 1949 the unit was reformed in Tor di Quinto as Armored Cavalry Squadron "Guide", which moved the same year to Casarsa. The squadron was equipped with M8 Greyhound armored cars and assigned to the Armored Brigade "Ariete" as the brigade's reconnaissance unit. On 1 October 1952 the Ariete was expanded to Armored Division "Ariete" and consequently on 25 November 1953 the Armored Cavalry Squadron "Guide" was expanded to Squadrons Group "Cavalleggeri Guide". In 1963 the squadrons group was sent to Longarone to help rescue efforts after the Vajont dam disaster. For its conduct in Longarone the squadrons group was awarded a Silver Medal of Civil Valour.

During the 1975 army reform the army disbanded the regimental level and newly independent battalions were granted for the first time their own flags. On 1 July 1975 the squadrons group was renamed 19th Reconnaissance Squadrons Group "Cavalleggeri Guide" and assigned the flag and traditions of the Regiment "Cavalleggeri Guide" (19th). The squadrons group consisted of a command, a command and services squadron, and three reconnaissance squadrons equipped with Fiat Campagnola reconnaissance vehicles, M113 armored personnel carriers, and M47 Patton tanks. The Guide continued to be the Armored Division "Ariete"'s reconnaissance unit. In 1980 the Guide began to replace its M47 Patton tanks with Leopard 1A2 main battle tanks.

For its conduct and work after the 1976 Friuli earthquake the squadrons group was awarded a Silver Medal of Army Valour, which was affixed to the squadrons group's flag and added to its coat of arms.

In 1986 the Italian Army disbanded the divisional level and placed brigades under direct command of its Army Corps. With the Ariete scheduled to disband the 19th Reconnaissance Squadrons Group "Cavalleggeri Guide" was transferred to the 32nd Armored Brigade "Mameli".

Recent times 

After the end of the Cold War the Italian Army began to draw down its forces and the Mameli brigade was one of the first brigades to disband. On 1 April 1991 the brigade was deactivated with most of its units, while the "Cavalleggeri Guide" moved from Casarsa to Salerno in the South of Italy, where the squadrons group was assigned to the Bersaglieri Brigade "Garibaldi". On 4 August 1991 the 19th Reconnaissance Squadrons Group "Cavalleggeri Guide" lost its autonomy and the next day the squadrons group entered the newly formed 19th Regiment "Cavalleggeri Guide", which on 3 September 1992 was renamed Regiment "Cavalleggeri Guide" (19th). The regiment consisted of a command, a command and services squadron, and a squadrons group with three armored squadrons equipped with wheeled Centauro tank destroyers.

In 1992 the regiment participated in the international Unified Task Force and UNOSOM II missions in Somalia. In December 1998 the regiment was deployed to North Macedonia for a possible NATO-led ground invasion of Kosovo during the Kosovo War. After the signing of the Kumanovo Agreement between Yugoslavia and the Kosovo Force the regiment entered Kosovo as part of the Bersaglieri Brigade "Garibaldi". The regiment remained in Kosovo until 7 September 1999 and for its conduct there was awarded a Gold Medal of Army Valour, which was affixed to the regiment's flag and added to the regiment's coat of arms.

Current structure 

As of 2022 the Regiment "Cavalleggeri Guide" (19th) consists of:

  Regimental Command, in Salerno
 Command and Logistic Support Squadron
 1st Reconnaissance Squadrons Group
 1st Reconnaissance Squadron "San Marco"
 2nd Reconnaissance Squadron "San Giusto"
 3rd Reconnaissance Squadron "San Martino"
 Heavy Armored Squadron "San Giorgio"

The Command and Logistic Support Squadron fields the following platoons: C3 Platoon, Transport and Materiel Platoon, Medical Platoon, and Commissariat Platoon. The three reconnaissance squadrons are equipped with VTLM Lince vehicles and Centauro tank destroyers, the latter of which are scheduled to be replaced by Freccia reconnaissance vehicles. The Heavy Armor Squadron is equipped with Centauro tank destroyers, which are being replaced by Centauro II tank destroyers.

See also 
 Bersaglieri Brigade "Garibaldi"

External links
Italian Army Website: Reggimento "Cavalleggeri Guide" (19°)

References

Cavalry Regiments of Italy